Cor Boonstra (Leeuwarden, 7 January 1938) is mainly known as president of the Board of Directors of Philips (1996–2001).

Biography 

At the age of 16, he quit his study at the Hogere burgerschool and started to work for Unilever. In 1974 he started to work for Sara Lee, where he ultimately became the president of the board of directors.

On 31 December 1993 he withdrew from Sara Lee. In the beginning of 1994 he was asked by former Philips top executive Jan Timmer to participate in the Board of Directors of Philips, to breathe new life to the brand Philips. Boonstra was responsible for the 'Let's make things better'- campaign.

Two years after his commencement of employment with Philips, Boonstra became the successor of Timmer as the president of the board of directors. He held this leading position until 2001. While Boonstra was in charge, the market-value of Philips increased fivefold mainly by focusing on short-term profits and selling off company units like BSO/Origin (now a part of Atos and record company PolyGram. During his leadership he moved the head office (the top 350 employees) of Philips from Eindhoven to Amsterdam, the capital of the country. Since most of the regular staff remained in Eindhoven, the birthplace of the company, this move was not popular among Philips employees. In 2000 Boonstra was chosen 'top executive of the year'. Boonstra divorced two times, and has two children (Cor Boonstra and Roelof Boonstra) of his first wife.

In 1998 Boonstra and his first wife barely survived a hijacking. At that time Boonstra already was having an affair with Sylvia Tóth. A few years later, Boonstra was accused of insider trading in which he allegedly earned several hundreds of thousands of euros by trading in Endemol shares (where Sylvia Tóth was a member of the board) just before that company was acquired by the Spanish Telefónica. Boonstra was ultimately acquitted in court as no hard evidence existed that his partner Tóth had shared the information on the impending deal with him. The Dutch press referred to the inside deal as the "pillow talk deal".

A few months later Cor Boonstra was again charged for not reporting trading in Ahold shares where he himself was a member of the board. He was found guilty and charged a 135.000 euro fine.

References 
 Encyclopedia, Dutch Wikipedia, Article Cor Boonstra, User Falcongj, added 2 January 2004, last edit 4 April 2009

External links
 Philips Global - access to worldwide local sites, research, consumer products, Healthcare, lighting etc.

Notes

1938 births
Living people
Dutch chief executives in the manufacturing industry
Dutch chief executives in the technology industry
Dutch chief executives in the food industry
Dutch businesspeople
Philips employees
Chairmen of Philips
Dutch corporate directors
Unilever people
People from Leeuwarden